Daniyar Munaytbasov (born March 30, 1976) is a boxer from Kazakhstan. He represented his native country at the 2000 Summer Olympics in Sydney, Australia. There he was stopped in the quarterfinals of the Men's Welterweight Division (– 67 kg) division by Ukraine's eventual silver medalist Sergey Dotsenko.

References
 sports-reference

1976 births
Living people
Welterweight boxers
Boxers at the 2000 Summer Olympics
Olympic boxers of Kazakhstan
Boxers at the 1998 Asian Games
Kazakhstani male boxers
Asian Games competitors for Kazakhstan